Counties 3 Surrey  is a rugby union competition covering the English county of Surrey and parts of south-west London. It sits at the ninth tier of the English rugby union system. The teams play home and away matches from September through to April. Promoted teams move up to Surrey 2 and relegated teams move down to Counties 4 Surrey.  

Each year some of the clubs in this division also take part in the RFU Junior Vase - a level 9-11 national competition.

Teams for 2021-22

The teams competing in 2021-22 achieved their places in the league based on performances in 2019-20, the 'previous season' column in the table below refers to that season not 2020-21.

Raynes Park withdrew from the league in October 2021, consequently it ran with nine teams instead.

Season 2020–21

On 30 October the RFU announced  that a decision had been taken to cancel Adult Competitive Leagues (National League 1 and below) for the 2020–21 season meaning Surrey 3 was not contested.

Teams for 2019-20

Teams for 2018-19

Teams for 2017-18

Teams for 2016-17
Croydon (relegated from Surrey 2)
Guildfordians (relegated from Surrey 2)
London Media
Merton
Metropolitan Police
Old Haileyburians  (promoted from Surrey 4)
Old Johnians  (promoted from Surrey 4)
Old Rutlishians
Reeds Weybridge 
Reigate

Teams for 2015-16
Bec Old Boys
London Media
Merton
Metropolitan Police
Mitcham & Carshalton
Old Glynonians
Old Rutlishians
Reeds Weybridge (promoted from Surrey 4)
Reigate (promoted from Surrey 4)
Streatham-Croydon

Teams for 2014-15
Bec Old Boys (relegated from Surrey 2)
London Media	
Merton (promoted from Surrey 4)
Metropolitan Police 
Mitcham	
Old Georgians (promoted from Surrey 4)
Old Glynonians
Old Rutlishians (relegated from Surrey 2)
Streatham-Croydon  (relegated from Surrey 2)
Worth Old Boys

Teams for 2013-14
Guildfordians
London Media	
Metropolitan Police
Mitcham		
Old Caterhamians
Old Glynonians
Old Haileyburians
Old Radleian	
Raynes Park	
Worth Old Boys

Teams for 2012-13
Economicals
Guildfordians
London Media	
Mitcham		
Old Amplefordians
Old Caterhamians
Old Haileyburians
Old Radleian	
Raynes Park	
Reigate

Teams for 2011-12
Economicals
Haslemere
London Media	
Mitcham		
Old Amplefordians
Old Caterhamians
Old Radleian
Old Tonbridgians	
Raynes Park	
Streatham-Croydon

Teams for 2010-11
Economicals
London Media	
Merton
Mitcham		
Old Amplefordians
Old Glynonians
Old Radleian
Old Rutlishians
Old Tonbridgians	
Worth Old Boys

Teams for 2009-10
CL London - promoted from Surrey 4 in 2009
Haslemere
Merton
Mitcham
Old Amplefordians
Old Oundelians
Old Radleian
Old Tiffinians
Streatham-Croydon
Worth Old Boys

Original teams
When league rugby began in 1987 this division contained the following teams:

Battersea Ironsides
BBC
Harrodians
Haslemere
Law Society
Lightwater
London Fire Brigade
Old Caterhamians
Old Croydonians
Racal-Decca
Reigate & Redhill
Surrey Police

Surrey 3 Honours

Surrey 3 (1987–1993)

The original Surrey 3 was tier 10 league, with promotion up to Surrey 2 (initially Surrey 2A and Surrey 2B) and relegation down to Surrey 4.

Surrey 3 (1993–1996)

The creation of National 5 South meant that Surrey 3 dropped from a tier 10 league to a tier 11 league for the years that National 5 South was active.  Promotion and relegation continued to Surrey 2 and Surrey 4 respectively.

Surrey 3 (1996–2000)

The cancellation of National 5 South at the end of the 1995–96 season meant that Surrey 3 reverted to being a tier 10 league.  Promotion and relegation continued to Surrey 2 and Surrey 4 respectively.

Surrey 3 (2000–2009)

The introduction of London 4 South West ahead of the 2000–01 season meant Surrey 3 dropped to become a tier 11 league.  Promotion was to Surrey 2, while the cancellation of Surrey 4 at the end of the 1999–00 season, meant that there was no relegation until Surrey 4 was reinstated from the 2005–06 season onward.

Surrey 3 (2009–present)

Surrey 3 remained a tier 11 league despite national restructuring by the RFU.  Promotion and relegation continued to Surrey 2 and Surrey 4 respectively.

Number of league titles

Bec Old Boys (3)
Old Caterhamians (3)
Worth Old Boys (3)
London Media (2)
Old Amplefordians (2)
London Cornish (2)
Streatham-Croydon (2)
Battersea Ironsides (1)
CL London (1)
Harrodians (1)
Haslemere (1)
Lightwater (1)
Metropolitan Police (1)
Old Blues (1)
Old Cranleighans (1)
Old Freemens (1)
Old Georgians (1)
Old Haileyburians (1)
Old Reedonians (1)
Old Suttonians (1)
Old Wellingtonians (1)
Shirley Wanderers (1)
Wandsworthians (1)
Woking (1)

Notes

See also
London & SE Division RFU
Surrey RFU
English rugby union system
Rugby union in England

References

External links
Surrey Rugby Football Union

Rugby union leagues in England
Rugby union in Surrey